Joel Hass is an American mathematician and a professor of mathematics and at the University of California, Davis. His work focuses on geometric and topological problems in dimension 3.

Biography
Hass received his Ph.D. from the University of California, Berkeley in 1981 under the supervision of Robion Kirby. He joined the Davis faculty in 1988.

In 2012 he became a fellow of the American Mathematical Society. From 2010 to 2014 he served as the chair of the UC Davis mathematics department.

Research contributions
Hass is known for proving the equal-volume special case of the double bubble conjecture, for proving that the unknotting problem is in NP, and for giving an exponential bound on the number of Reidemeister moves needed to reduce the unknot to a circle.

Selected publications
Research papers
.
.
.
.

Books
.
.
2004: Student Solutions Manual,  Maurice D. Weir, Joel Hass, George B. Thomas, Frank R Giordano

References

External links
Home page at UC Davis
Google scholar profile

Year of birth missing (living people)
Living people
20th-century American mathematicians
University of California, Berkeley alumni
University of California, Davis faculty
Fellows of the American Mathematical Society
Topologists
21st-century American mathematicians